Steve Martin's The Winds of Whoopee (a.k.a. simply The Winds of Whoopee) is a 1983 American comedy television special on NBC, produced and written by Steve Martin. The title was a take-off of The Winds of War, which premiered as a TV miniseries on the same night on ABC. In a 30-second spot, Orson Welles says: "Why spend 18 hours watching someone else's war, when you know how it comes out? We win, and then have to buy all their cars. Watch Steve Martin's The Winds of Whoopee. See it all in one hour on Sunday."

The show is a combination of old and new material compiled from past Martin specials and his appearances on Saturday Night Live and The Tonight Show.

References

External links
 

1983 in American television
1983 television specials
1980s American television specials
1980s in comedy
NBC television specials
Works by Steve Martin